Independence Historic District may refer to:

Independence Historic District (Evansville, Indiana), listed on the NRHP in Indiana
Independence Downtown Historic District, Independence, KS, listed on the NRHP in Kansas
Independence Historic District (Independence, Louisiana), listed on the NRHP in Louisiana 
Independence Historic District (Independence, Oregon), listed on the NRHP in Oregon
Independence Heights Residential Historic District, Houston, TX, listed on the NRHP in Texas